Till v. SCS Credit Corp., 541 U.S. 465 (2004), was a decision by the United States Supreme Court regarding a cramdown in the value of a loan during a Chapter 13 bankruptcy. 

The "decision that had no majority opinion, four justices held that the proper rate was the 9.5 percent one arrived at by modifying the average national loan rate to make up for the increased risk of non-payment. While this would not give the creditors the same amount of money that they might have gotten had they seized the collateral for the loan, it nevertheless met the statutory requirement that the repayments equal the "total present value." Justice Clarence Thomas, in a separate opinion that provided the fifth vote needed for judgment, found that the 9.5 percent rate was acceptable, but that it could be even lower because the Bankruptcy Code did not require the judge to accommodate for the risk of non-payment."

See also
 List of United States Supreme Court cases, volume 541
List of United States Supreme Court cases

References

External links
 

United States Supreme Court cases
United States Supreme Court cases of the Rehnquist Court
United States bankruptcy case law
2004 in United States case law